Fritz Isser was an Austrian bobsledder who competed during the 1960s. Along with Pepi Isser, Heini Isser, and Franz Isser, he won the bronze medal in the four-man event at the 1962 FIBT World Championships in Garmisch-Partenkirchen.

References
Bobsleigh four-man world championship medalists since 1930

Austrian male bobsledders
Possibly living people
Year of birth missing